Andrei Igorevich Semyonov (born 8 June 1992) is a Russian football defender. He plays for FC Shinnik Yaroslavl.

Club career
He made his debut in the Russian Second Division for FC Lokomotiv-2 Moscow on 23 July 2012 in a game against FC Znamya Truda Orekhovo-Zuyevo.

He made his Russian Football National League debut for FC Sakhalin Yuzhno-Sakhalinsk on 6 July 2014 in a game against FC Anzhi Makhachkala.

References

External links
 
 
 

1992 births
Sportspeople from Tver Oblast
Living people
Russia youth international footballers
Russia under-21 international footballers
Russian footballers
Association football defenders
FC Lokomotiv Moscow players
PFC CSKA Moscow players
FC Sakhalin Yuzhno-Sakhalinsk players
FC Luch Vladivostok players
FC Sokol Saratov players
FC Fakel Voronezh players
FC Neftekhimik Nizhnekamsk players
FC Shinnik Yaroslavl players
Russian First League players
Russian Second League players